SS Samuel Ashe was a Liberty ship built in the United States during World War II. She was named after Samuel Ashe the ninth Governor of the US state of North Carolina from 1795 to 1798. He was also one of the first three judges of the North Carolina Superior Court in 1787.

Construction
Samuel Ashe was laid down 17 July 1942, under a Maritime Commission (MARCOM) contract, MC hull 164, by the North Carolina Shipbuilding Company, Wilmington, North Carolina: she was launched 17 September 1942, sponsored by Miss Shirley Jean Beasley, the daughter of E.O. Beasley, the foreman of welders at NCSB.

History
She was allocated to American South African Line, Inc., on 29 September 1942. Among her missions was repatriating part of the US 1269th Engineer Combat Battalion stateside from Antwerp in August 1945.

On 6 January 1948, she was laid up in the James River Reserve Fleet, Jones Point, New York. She was laid up in the, Hudson River Reserve Fleet, Jones Point, New York, 23 May 1953.

On 11 June 1953, she was withdrawn from the fleet to be loaded with grain under the "Grain Program 1953", she returned loaded with grain on 25 June 1953. She was withdrawn from the fleet on 2 July 1956, to have the grain unloaded, she returned reloaded on 24 July 1956. On 3 January 1958, she was withdrawn from the fleet to be unloaded, she returned empty on 13 January 1958. She was withdrawn from the fleet on 8 September 1958, to be loaded with grain, she returned loaded with grain on 17 September 1958. She was withdrawn from the fleet on 22 December 1959, to have the grain unloaded, she returned empty on 30 December 1959. She was withdrawn from the fleet on 10 October 1960, to be loaded with grain, she returned loaded with grain on 29 October 1960. She was withdrawn from the fleet on 12 April 1960, to have the grain unloaded, she returned empty on 20 April 1963.

She was sold for scrapping, on 27 May 1968, to Northern Metals Co. She was removed from the fleet on 30 June 1969.

References

Bibliography

 
 
 
 
  

 

Liberty ships
Ships built in Wilmington, North Carolina
1942 ships
Hudson River Reserve Fleet
James River Reserve Fleet